Elections for Harrow London Borough Council were held on 6 May 2010.  The 2010 General Election and other local elections took place on the same day.

In London council elections the entire council is elected every four years, as opposed to some local elections where one councillor is elected every year in three out of the four years.

Summary of results

References

Council elections in the London Borough of Harrow
2010 London Borough council elections